Károly Solymár (23 December 1894 – September 1945) was a Hungarian hurdler. He competed in the men's 110 metres hurdles at the 1912 Summer Olympics.

References

External links
 

1894 births
1945 deaths
Athletes (track and field) at the 1912 Summer Olympics
Hungarian male hurdlers
Olympic athletes of Hungary
Place of birth missing
Hungarian military personnel of World War II
Hungarian people executed by the Soviet Union
Austro-Hungarian prisoners of war in World War I